Santo Tomás Hueyotlipan is the municipal seat of Santo Tomás Hueyotlipan Municipality, Puebla, Mexico.

Populated places in Puebla